Lusambu Mafuta (born 7 May 1969) is a Congolese judoka. He competed in the men's lightweight event at the 1992 Summer Olympics.

References

External links
 

1969 births
Living people
Democratic Republic of the Congo male judoka
Olympic judoka of the Democratic Republic of the Congo
Judoka at the 1992 Summer Olympics
Place of birth missing (living people)
21st-century Democratic Republic of the Congo people